The 1962 Asian Games, officially known as the Fourth Asian Games, was a multi-sport event held in Jakarta, Indonesia, from 24 August to 4 September 1962. This edition of the Asian Games was a subject of major international controversy when the host nation denied two Asian Games Federation members, Republic of China and Israel, to participate in the Games. Consequently, the International Olympic Committee revoked the Indonesia's membership and barred it from participating in the 1964 Summer Olympics in Tokyo. The Games and related infrastructure development projects in Jakarta were heavily funded by the Soviet Union and were given "top priority" by the then-President of Indonesia, Sukarno.

Medal table

References

 The Straits Times, 5 September 1962, Page 19
 Overall Medal Standings - Jakarta 1962

Medal table
1962